James Stopford, 1st Earl of Courtown (1700 – 12 January 1770) was an Irish politician.

Courtown was the son of James Stopford, of Courtown, County Wexford, who represented Wexford County in the Irish House of Commons, and his wife Frances (née Jones). He succeeded his father as member of parliament for Wexford County in 1721, a seat he held until 1727, and then represented Fethard (County Wexford) from 1727 to 1758. In 1756 he was appointed High Sheriff of Wexford. In 1758 he was raised to the Peerage of Ireland as Baron Courtown, of Courtown in the County of Wexford. Four years later he was further honoured when he was made Viscount Stopford and Earl of Courtown, in the County of Wexford, also in the Peerage of Ireland.

Family
Lord Courtown married Elizabeth, daughter of the Right Reverend Edward Smyth, Bishop of Down and Connor, and his first wife and cousin Elizabeth Smyth, in 1727. He died in January 1770 and was succeeded in the earldom by his eldest son James, who became a prominent Tory politician. His second son the Hon. Edward Stopford (1732–1794) was a Lieutenant-General in the Army. Another son, the Hon Thomas Stopford, became Bishop of Cork and Ross.

Lady Courtown survived her husband by 18 years and died in September 1788.

Notes

References
Kidd, Charles, Williamson, David (editors). Debrett's Peerage and Baronetage (1990 edition). New York: St Martin's Press, 1990, 

1700 births
1770 deaths
Peers of Ireland created by George II
Irish MPs 1715–1727
Irish MPs 1727–1760
Members of the Parliament of Ireland (pre-1801) for County Wexford constituencies
High Sheriffs of Wexford
James
Earls of Courtown